Bottom-up may refer to:

 Bottom-up analysis, a fundamental analysis technique in accounting and finance
 Bottom-up parsing, a computer science strategy
 Bottom-up processing, in Pattern recognition (psychology)
 Bottom-up theories of galaxy formation and evolution
 Bottom-up tree automaton, in data structures
 Bottom-up integration testing, in software testing
 Top-down and bottom-up design, strategies of information processing and knowledge ordering
 Bottom-up proteomics, a laboratory technique involving proteins
 Bottom Up Records, a record label founded by Shyheim
 Bottom-up approach of the Holocaust, a viewpoint on the causes of the Holocaust

See also 
 Bottoms Up (disambiguation)
 Top-down (disambiguation)
 Capsizing, when a boat is turned upside down
 Mundanity, an precursor of social movements
 Social movements, bottom-up societal reform
 Turtling (sailing)